"Alone With You" is a song by American singer Tevin Campbell. It was written and produced by Al B. Sure! and Kyle West for his debut studio album T.E.V.I.N. (1991). The song served as the album's sixth single, becoming its second song to reach number one on the US R&B charts where it stayed for one week. The song didn't chart as well on the US Billboard Hot 100, peaking at number 72.

Track listings

Credits and personnel
Credits lifted from the liner notes of T.E.V.I.N..

Tevin Campbell – vocals
Quincy Jones – executive producer
Benny Medina – executive producer
Al B. Sure! – lyrics, producer
Kyle West – lyrics, producer

Charts

See also
List of number-one R&B singles of 1992 (U.S.)

References

1992 singles
Tevin Campbell songs
1991 songs
Warner Records singles
Songs written by Al B. Sure!
Songs written by Kyle West